In mathematics, the Śleszyński–Pringsheim theorem is a statement about convergence of certain continued fractions. It was discovered by Ivan Śleszyński and Alfred Pringsheim in the late 19th century.

It states that if an, bn, for n = 1, 2, 3, ... are real numbers and |bn| ≥ |an| + 1 for all n, then

 

converges absolutely to a number ƒ satisfying 0 < |ƒ| < 1, meaning that the series

where An / Bn are the convergents of the continued fraction, converges absolutely.

See also
Convergence problem

Notes and references 

Continued fractions
Theorems in real analysis